Gunvor Marianne Gustafsson Ericson (born 1960) is a Swedish politician and former member of the Riksdag, the national legislature. A member of the Green Party, she represented Södermanland County between October 2006 and September 2014. She was a substitute member of the Riksdag for Maria Wetterstrand between October 2004 and April 2005. She was leader of the Green Group in the Riksdag from September 2011 to March 2013.

Ericson was appointed as a political advisor to the Cabinet Co-ordination Committee (Statsrådsberedningen) in October 2014. She was later state secretary to Minister for the Environment Åsa Romson and state secretary to the Cabinet Co-ordination Committee.

References

1960 births
21st-century Swedish women politicians
Living people
Members of the Riksdag 2006–2010
Members of the Riksdag 2010–2014
Members of the Riksdag from the Green Party
Women members of the Riksdag